Shangri-La is an album by Elkie Brooks. Recorded between 2001 and 2002 at Woody Bay Studios, it was released on CD in 2003 by Classic Pictures.

Track listing 
"Morello"
"Naked in September"
"Eliyahu"
"Don't Be Stupid"
"Set Me Free"
"Avinu Malkenu"
"Strange Fruit"
"The Last Goodnight"
"Got to Do It Right Away"
"Never Known"
"Shangri-la"
"I Wanna Be (with You)"
"Modern Slaves"

Personnel 
Elkie Brooks – vocals
Jean Roussel – piano, keyboards
Johnny Dyke – piano, keyboards
Alan Welch – piano, keyboards
Al Hodge – guitars
John Giblin – bass guitar
Mike Richardson – drums
Humphrey Lyttelton – trumpet
Trevor Jordan – engineering
Jermaine Jordan – production

2003 albums
Elkie Brooks albums